Machiguenga (Matsigenka) is a major Arawakan language in the Campa sub-branch of the family. It is spoken in the Urubamba River Basin and along the Manu River in the Cusco and Madre de Dios departments of Peru by around 6,200 people. According to Ethnologue, it is experiencing pressure from Spanish and Quechua in the Urubamba region, but is active and healthy in the Manu region (most speakers are monolingual in Matsigenka).  It is close enough to Nomatsiguenga that the two are sometimes considered dialects of a single language; both are spoken by the Machiguenga people. Nanti is partially mutually intelligible but ethnically distinct.

There is extensive morphological inflection in Matsigenka; it is considered to be polysynthetic and features an agglutinative morphology, where both suffixes and prefixes are used to mark various inflectional categories.

Phonology

Consonants 

 Sounds /p, t, tʲ/ are heard as voiced [b, d, dʲ] after nasal consonants. They may also be heard as prenasalized [ᵐb, ⁿd] in word-initial positions.
 /β/ can be heard as approximant sounds [w, β̞] intervocalically between /a/. It can also be heard as a voiced plosive [b] after nasals, and as prenasal [ᵐb] in word-initial position.
 Sounds /ɣ, ɣʲ/ can be heard as approximant sounds [ɰ, ɰʲ] intervocalically in syllable-initial position, and /ɣʲ/ as [j] in free variation in word-initial position. They are also heard as [ɡ, ɡʲ] after nasal sounds. /ɣ, ɣʲ/ can be heard as prenasal [ᵑɡ, ᵑɡʲ] in word-initial position.
 /n/ can be heard as [ŋ] before velar sounds.

Vowels 

 /i, u/ can be heard as semivowels [w, j] when preceding vowels.

References

Languages of Peru
Campa languages